Bruno Mantovani (born 8 October 1974) is a French composer. He has been awarded first prizes from the Conservatoire de Paris which he joined in 1993. His work has been commissioned by the French government as well as other organizations. In September 2010 he was appointed to the post of director of the Paris Conservatory.

Biography 

At 37, Bruno Mantovani became the director of the Conservatoire de Paris.

In October 2018, his new composition Threnos was premiered at the Chicago Symphony Orchestra and conducted by Marin Alsop. In March 2019, he was named music director of the Ensemble Orchestral Contemporain, a position that will start in January 2020.

Awards
 2010 Claudio-Abbado-Kompositionspreis of the Orchester-Akademie of the Berlin Philharmonic

Works list

Orchestra
 Art d'écho, for orchestra, 2000
 Con Leggerezza, for orchestra, 2004
 Concerto pour deux altos et orchestre, for two violas and orchestra, 2009 
 Concerto pour deux pianos, for two pianos and orchestra 2012
 Concerto pour violoncelle, for cello and orchestra, 2005
 Fantaisie, for piano and orchestra, 2010
 Finale, for orchestra, 2007 
 Jeux d'eau, for violin and orchestra, 2011
 Le Cycle des gris, for orchestra, 2005
 Le Livre des illusions, for orchestra, 2009
 Mit Ausdruck, for bass clarinet and orchestra, 2003
 On the dance floor, for orchestra, 2003
 6 Pièces for orchestra, 2005
 Postludium, for orchestra, 2010
 Siddharta, ballet, 2010
 Smatroll (Le Lutin), for orchestra, 2010
 Time Stretch (on gesualdo), for orchestra, 2006 
 Upon one note, for orchestra, 2011
 Zapping, for flute and orchestra, 2004

Ensemble music
 ...273..., for 17 musicians, 2010
 Concerto de chambre no.1, for 17 musicians, 2010
 Concerto de chambre no.2, for 6 musicians, 2010
 2 Contrepoints de l'Art de la Fugue, for 7 cellos, 2007 
 D'un rêve parti, for sextet, 2000
 Eclair de Lune, for three ensembles and electronics, 2007
 Le Sette Chiese, for large ensemble, 2002
 Les Danses interrompues, for 6 instruments, 2001
 Par la suite, for flute and ensemble, 2002
 Série Noire, for 14 instruments, 2000
 Si près, si loin (d'une fantaisie), for two pianos and two ensembles, 2007
 Spirit of Alberti, for ensemble, 2013
 Streets, for ensemble, 2006
 Troisième Round, for saxophone and ensemble, 2001
 Turbulences, for 12 musicians, 1998

Chamber music
 All'ungarese, for violin and piano, 2009
 Appel d'air, for flute and piano, 2001
 Blue girl with red wagon, for string quartet and piano, 2005
 D'une seule voix, for violin and cello, 2007
 Da Roma, for clarinet, viola and piano, 2005
 East side, west side, for five instruments, 2003
 Face à face, for four clarinets, 2010
 Happy B., for flute, violin, viola and cello, 2005
 Haunted Nights, for clarinet, piano and vibraphone, 2002
 Hopla, for flute and boules de pétanque, 2010
 Icare, for two pianos, 2009
 L'Ere de rien, for flute, clarinet and piano, 2002
 L'Incandescence de la bruine, for saxophone and piano, 1997
 METAL, for two clarinets, 2003
 8 Moments musicaux, for violin, cello and piano, 2008
 5 Pièces pour Paul Klee, for cello and piano, 2007
 4 Pièces pour quatuor à cordes, (Bleu, les Fées, L'Ivresse, BWV 1007), 2005
 Quelques effervescences, for viola and piano, 2006
 Quintette, for 2 violins, 2 violas and cello, 2013
 Quintette pour Bertold Brecht, for harp and string quartet, 2007
 Un mois d'octobre, for bassoon and piano, 2001
 Un Souffle, for flute and 4 percussions, 2005
 Une autre incandescence for clarinet, viola and piano 1998
 Until, for 3 cellos, 2010
 You are connected, for string trio, 2001

Solo
 8'20" chrono, for accordion, 2007
 Bug, for clarinet, 1999
 Dédale, for piano, 2009
 Entre Parenthèses, for piano, 2006
 4 Etudes, for piano, 2003
 Früh, for flute, 2001
 Happy hours, for violin, 2007
 Italienne, for piano, 2001
 Jazz Connotation, for piano, 1998
 Le Grand jeu, for percussion and electronics, 1999
 Le Livre de Jeb, for piano, 2009
 Little Italy, for viola, 2005
 4 Mélodies arméniennes, for flute, 2010
 Moi jeu..., for marimba, 1999
 One-Way, for cello, 2012
 Suonare, for piano, 2006
 The worst of, for piano, 2013
 Tocar, for harp, 2007
 Trait d'union, for clarinet, 2007

Vocal or choral music
 Akhmatova (opera), opera premiered at Opera Bastille, 2011
 Cantate No.1, for chorus and ensemble, 2006
 Cantate No.2 (sur G. Leopardi), for soprano and clarinet, 2008
 Cantate No.3 (sur Friedrich von Schiller), for chorus and orchestra, 2012
 Cantate No.4, for cello, accordion and chorus, 2013
 Das erschafft der Dichter nicht, for soprano and ensemble, 2002
 L'Autre côté, opera, 2006
 La Morte Meditata, for mezzo-soprano and ensemble, 2000
 L'Enterrement de Mozart, for 5 voices and ensemble, 2008
 Monde évanoui (Fragments pour Babylone), for chorus, 2008
 5 Poèmes de Janos Pilinsky, for chamber chorus, 2005
 Vier Geistliche Gedichte, for chamber chorus, 2007

References

Further reading
 Thiollet, Jean-Pierre, Sax, Mule & Co, Paris, H & D, 2004, "Bruno Mantovani",  p. 147–148.
 Humbertclaude Éric, Empreintes : regards sur la création musicale contemporaine, Paris, L’Harmattan, 2008, pp. 9–14.

External links
 Bruno Mantovani website
BMOP :: Bruno Mantovani

 A biography from Editions Henry Lemoine website

1974 births
Living people
French opera composers
French male conductors (music)
Conservatoire de Paris alumni
Directors of the Conservatoire de Paris
École Normale de Musique de Paris alumni
21st-century French composers
French male composers
Chevaliers of the Légion d'honneur
Officiers of the Ordre des Arts et des Lettres
21st-century French conductors (music)
21st-century French male musicians